The 2018 Columbia Lions football team represented Columbia University in the 2018 NCAA Division I FCS football season as a member of the Ivy League. They were led by fourth-year head coach Al Bagnoli and played their home games at Robert K. Kraft Field at Lawrence A. Wien Stadium. They finished the season 6–4, 3–4 in Ivy League play to finish in a three-way tie for fourth place. Columbia averaged 5,667 fans per game.

Previous season
The Lions finished the 2017 season 8–2, 5–2 in Ivy League play to finish in a tie for second place.

Schedule
The 2018 schedule consisted of five home and five away games. The Lions hosted Ivy League foes Princeton, Dartmouth, Yale, and Cornell, and traveled to Penn, Harvard, and Brown. Homecoming coincided with the game against Dartmouth on October 20.

In 2018, Columbia's non-conference opponents were Central Connecticut of the Northeast Conference, Georgetown of the Patriot League, and Marist of the Pioneer Football League.

Game summaries

at Central Connecticut

at Georgetown

Princeton

Marist

at Penn

Dartmouth

Yale

at Harvard

at Brown

Cornell

References

Columbia
Columbia Lions football seasons
Columbia Lions football